The ninth and final season of the animated television series My Little Pony: Friendship Is Magic, developed by Lauren Faust, originally aired on the Discovery Family channel in the United States. The series is based on Hasbro's My Little Pony line of toys and animated works and is often referred by collectors to be the fourth generation, or "G4", of the My Little Pony franchise. Season 9 of the series premiered on April 6, 2019, on Discovery Family, an American pay television channel partly owned by Hasbro, and concluded with a three-part series finale on October 12.

The final season focuses on Twilight preparing to become the new ruler of Equestria before Princess Celestia and Princess Luna's retirement. At the same time, an evil ram named Grogar recruits Twilight and her friends' worst enemies in a plot to take over the kingdom.

Development 
On February 17, 2018, at the American International Toy Fair in New York, a ninth season was announced by Hasbro. In a TV Kids Guide by Gaumont, it was confirmed that season nine will have 26 episodes. At the following year's Toy Fair, it was confirmed that this will be the final season of the series. The writing for this season began in late 2017.

In a March 2019 Discovery Family press release, it was announced that Patton Oswalt and "Weird Al" Yankovic would return to reprise their roles as Quibble Pants and Cheese Sandwich, respectively. According to series' director Jim Miller, Discord impersonating Grogar was planned since the beginning of the season, as they wanted Chrysalis, Tirek and Cozy Glow to be the villains since they had more connection to the main characters.

Series finale 
Upon the broadcast of the three-part series finale "The Ending of the End - Parts 1 and 2" and "The Last Problem", when asked if Applejack and Rainbow Dash were romantically involved in the future setting of "The Last Problem", Miller replied "it’s up to the individual viewer to decide what those two are to each other". When asked a similar question regarding Fluttershy and Discord, Miller replied that it was "open to interpretation."

Cast

Main 
 Tara Strong as Twilight Sparkle
 Rebecca Shoichet as Twilight Sparkle (singing voice)
 Tabitha St. Germain as Rarity
 Kazumi Evans as Rarity (singing voice)
 Ashleigh Ball as Applejack and Rainbow Dash
 Andrea Libman as Fluttershy and Pinkie Pie
 Shannon Chan-Kent as Pinkie Pie (singing voice)
 Cathy Weseluck as Spike

Recurring 

 The Young Six
 Vincent Tong as Sandbar
 Gavin Langelo as Gallus
 Katrina Salisbury as Yona
 Shannon Chan-Kent as Smolder
 Lauren Jackson as Silverstream
 Devyn Dalton as Ocellus
 Kelly Sheridan as Starlight Glimmer
 Nicole Oliver as Princess Celestia
 Tabitha St. Germain as Princess Luna
 The Cutie Mark Crusaders
 Michelle Creber as Apple Bloom
 Madeleine Peters as Scootaloo
 Claire Corlett as Sweetie Belle
 John de Lancie as Discord
 Mark Acheson as Lord Tirek
 Kathleen Barr as Queen Chrysalis and Trixie Lulamoon
 Sunni Westbrook as Cozy Glow
 Doc Harris as Grogar

Notes

Minor

Single roles 

 Alvin Sanders as King Sombra
 Andrew Francis as Shining Armor
 Britt McKillip as Princess Cadance
 Chris Britton as Star Swirl the Bearded
 Kyle Rideout as Thorax
 Ryan Beil as Zephyr Breeze
 Ellen Kennedy as Dusty Pages
 Shirley Milliner as Apple Rose
 Lee Tockar as Snips
 Patton Oswalt as Quibble Pants
 Ali Milner as Ember
 Vincent Tong as Garble
 Adam Kirschner as Mudbriar
 Ingrid Nilson as Maud Pie
 Cole Howard as Terramar
 Zach LeBlanc as Skeedaddle
 Bill Newton as Snap Shutter
 Cathy Weseluck as Mayor Mare
 Trevor Devall as Fancy Pants
 "Weird Al" Yankovic as Cheese Sandwich
 Kelli Ogmundson as Lighthoof
 Diana Kaarina as Shimmy Shake
 Richard Newman as Cranky Doodle
 Sam Vincent as Feather Flatterfly
 Michael Daingerfield as Braeburn
 Brenda Crichlow as Zecora
 Erin Mathews as Gabby
 Chantal Strand as Spoiled Rich
 Brian Dobson as Skybeak
 Chiara Zanni as Daring Do/A.K. Yearling
 Brian Drummond as Ahuizotl
 Rebecca Husain as Spur
 Rebecca Shoichet as Sugar Belle
 Matt Cowlrick as Rockhoof
 Garry Chalk as Prince Rutherford
 Christopher Gaze as Seaspray
 Kelly Metzger as Spitfire

Multiple roles 
 Tabitha St. Germain as Princess Flurry Heart, Muffins, First Folio, Granny Smith, and Mrs. Cake
 Kazumi Evans as Moondancer, Rose, and Octavia Melody
 Richard Cox as Snails, Clump, and Grampa Gruff
 Scott Underwood as Rusty Bucket, Rogue, and Withers
 Nicole Oliver as Fume, Miss Cheerilee, and Dr. Fauna
 Peter New as Big McIntosh, Goldie Delicious, and Dr. Hooves
 Michael Dobson as Bulk Biceps and Dr. Caballeron/Martingale
 Ian Hanlin as Sunburst and Biff

Guest stars 
 Meredith Salenger as Clear Sky
 Alice Oswalt as Wind Sprint
 Jackie Blackmore as Aunt Holiday
 Saffron Henderson as Auntie Lofty
 Emily Tennant as Mane Allgood
 Jesse Inocalla as Sans Smirk
 Kira Tozer as Fire Flare
 Connor Parnell as Biscuit
 Sabrina Pitre as Luster Dawn

Episodes

Notes

Songs

References 

2019 American television seasons
2019 Canadian television seasons
9